The name Fu River may refer to several rivers in China:

 Fu River (Sichuan), or Fujiang, in Sichuan and Chongqing, a tributary of the Jialing River (Yangtze Basin)
 Fu River (Jiangxi), or Fuhe, in Jiangxi, a tributary of the Poyang Lake (Yangtze Basin)
 Fushui River, in Hubei, a tributary of the Yangtze River